The Denmar Correctional Center (DCC) is a state prison located near Hillsboro in Pocahontas County, West Virginia, USA.

Built on the site of the former Denmar Hospital (a facility for tuberculosis patients which closed in 1990), DCC was converted to a prison in 1993. A further building project was completed in 2000, including an Industries/Vocational Building.

External links
 Denmar Correctional Center

Prisons in West Virginia
Buildings and structures in Pocahontas County, West Virginia
1993 establishments in West Virginia